"The Girl I Love She Got Long Black Wavy Hair" (also known as "The Girl I Love") is a song performed by English rock band Led Zeppelin. It was recorded by the BBC on 16 June 1969 for Chris Grant's Tasty Pop Sundae show during the band's UK Tour of Summer 1969 and was broadcast on 22 June 1969. The song was later included on the live Led Zeppelin album BBC Sessions, released in 1997. It is the only known performance of the song by the band.

The lyrics in the first verse are an adaptation of the 1929 blues recording "The Girl I Love She Got Long Curley Hair" by Sleepy John Estes.  The 2016 remastered edition of The Complete BBC Sessions includes "Contains interpolations from "Let Me Love You Baby" by Willie Dixon [and] "Travelling Riverside Blues" by Robert Johnson" in the credits for the song.

References 

Led Zeppelin songs
1969 songs
Songs written by Jimmy Page
Songs written by Robert Plant
Songs written by John Paul Jones (musician)
Songs written by John Bonham
1997 singles
Song recordings produced by Jimmy Page
Atlantic Records singles